is the second single by Japanese singer Yōko Oginome. Written by Chinfa Kan and Tetsuya Furumoto, the single was released on July 21, 1984 by Victor Entertainment.

Background and release
The music video features Oginome as a young mechanic at an Esso gas station. Towards the end of the video, as she is working on a car, an American man approaches her. She thinks he will ask her out on a date, but is disappointed when he asks her to fuel his car.

The B-side, "Natsu no Hohoemi", was used as the ending theme of the Fuji TV drama special , which also starred Oginome.

"Sayonara kara Hajimaru Monogatari" peaked at No. 29 on Oricon's singles chart and sold over 44,000 copies. It earned Oginome the Excellent Newcomer Award at the 12th KBC Newcomer Song Festival, the Silver Award at the 14th Ginza Music Festival, the Silver Award at the 17th Shinjuku Music Festival, the New Face Award at the 11th Yokohama Music Festival, the Silver Award at the 10th All-Japan Kayo Music Festival, and the Outstanding Rookie Award at the 13th FNS Music Festival.

Oginome re-recorded the song with a synth-pop arrangement for her 1987 greatest hits album Pop Groover: The Best.

Track listing

Charts

References

External links

1984 singles
Yōko Oginome songs
Japanese-language songs
Songs with lyrics by Chinfa Kan
Victor Entertainment singles